Yvonne Weilharter (born 8 December 2000) is an Austrian footballer who plays as a defender for Austria Wien and the Austria women's national team.

Career
Weilharter has been capped for the Austria national team, appearing for the team during the 2019 FIFA Women's World Cup qualifying cycle.

Notes

References

External links
 
 
 

2000 births
Living people
Austrian women's footballers
Austria women's international footballers
Women's association football defenders
1. FFC Frankfurt players
Frauen-Bundesliga players